Francis Healey Albertson (February 2, 1909 – February 29, 1964) was an American  actor who had supporting roles in films such as It's a Wonderful Life (1946) and Psycho (1960).

Early life 
Albertson was a native of Fergus Falls, Minnesota, the first child of Frank (or Francis) B. and Mary ( Healey) Albertson. He spent his childhood first in nearby Frazee, and later in Puyallup, Washington. As a young man in Los Angeles, he worked as a laboratory assistant in a photographic shop, which resulted in contacts leading to his acting career.

Career

Albertson made well over 100 appearances (1923–1964) in movies and television. In his early career he often sang and danced in such films as Just Imagine (1930) and A Connecticut Yankee (1931). He was featured in Alice Adams (1935) as the title character's brother, and in Room Service (1938) he played opposite the Marx Brothers. He served in the U.S. Army Air Forces' First Motion Picture Unit making training films during World War II. As he aged. he moved from featured roles to supporting and character parts—in his later career he can be seen as Sam Wainwright, the businessman fond of saying "Hee-Haw" in the movie It's a Wonderful Life (1946).

On October 10, 1950, Albertson starred in "Give and Take" on Armstrong Circle Theatre. He portrayed future U.S. President Theodore Roosevelt in the 1956 episode "Rough Rider" of the television series My Friend Flicka. He guest-starred in the western series The Californians and twice in the crime drama Richard Diamond, Private Detective.

He was cast in 1959 and 1962 in different roles on Walter Brennan's sitcom The Real McCoys. In 1960, he appeared as General Devery in the episode "Strange Encounter" of the series Colt .45.

In 1960, Albertson appeared as Johnny Kent on Cheyenne in the episode titled "The Long Rope".

In 1960, he played the wealthy rancher Tom Cassidy at the beginning of Psycho (1960) who provides the $40,000 in cash that Janet Leigh's character later steals. In the 1960-61 television season, he played the character Mr. Cooper in five episodes of the sitcom Bringing Up Buddy, starring Frank Aletter. In 1962 he appeared as Henry Bildy on the TV western Lawman in the episode titled "Heritage of Hate". 

In 1964, Albertson was cast as Jim O'Neal in the episode "The Death of a Teacher" of drama Mr. Novak. One of his latter screen appearances was as Sam, the bewildered mayor of Sweet Apple, Ohio in the 1963 film musical Bye Bye Birdie.

His last appearance was on The Andy Griffith Show, in which he played a Marine commander completing an inspection. The episode aired on May 19, 1964, three months after Albertson died.

Death
Albertson died in his sleep at his home in Santa Monica, California, on February 29, 1964, aged 55. The cause of death was an apparent heart attack. He had five children from his two marriages. He was buried in Holy Cross Cemetery, Culver City, California.

Recognition
For his contributions to the film industry, Albertson received a motion pictures star on the Hollywood Walk of Fame at 6754 Hollywood Boulevard. The star was dedicated on February 8, 1960.

Filmography

The Covered Wagon (1923) as Minor Role (uncredited)
The Farmer's Daughter (1928) as Allan Boardman Jr.
Prep and Pep (1928) as Bunk Hill
Blue Skies (1929) as Richard Lewis (episode 2)
Words and Music (1929) as Skeet Mulroy
Salute (1929) as Midshipman Albert Edward Price
Happy Days (1929) as Frankie Albertson
Men Without Women (1930) as Ensign Albert Edward Price
The Big Party (1930) as Jack Hunter
Son of the Gods (1930) as Kicker
Spring Is Here (1930) as Stacy Adams
Born Reckless (1930) as Frank Sheldon
So This Is London (1930) as Junior Draper
Wild Company (1930) as Larry Grayson
Just Imagine (1930) as RT-42
A Connecticut Yankee (1931) as Emile le Poulet / Clarence
Big Business Girl (1931) as Johnny Saunders
Traveling Husbands (1931) as Barry Greene
The Brat (1931) as Stephen Forester
Way Back Home (1931) as David Clark
The Tiger's Son (1931)
The Cohens and Kellys in Hollywood (1932) as Frank Albertson (uncredited)
Racing Youth (1932) as Teddy Blue
Huddle (1932) as Larry
Air Mail (1932) as Tommy Bogan
The Lost Special (1932, Serial) as Tom Hood
The Billion Dollar Scandal (1933) as Babe Partos
The Cohens and Kellys in Trouble (1933) as Bob Graham
Ann Carver's Profession (1933) as Jim Thompson
Dangerous Crossroads (1933)
Midshipman Jack (1933) as Russell H. Burns
Ever in My Heart (1933) as Sam Archer
Rainbow Over Broadway (1933) as Don Hayes
King for a Night (1933) as Dick Morris
The Last Gentleman (1934) as Allan Blaine, Augusta's adopted son
The Life of Vergie Winters (1934) as Ranny Truesdale
Hollywood Hoodlum (1934) as Daniel Patrick Ryan
Bachelor of Arts (1934) as Pete Illings
Enter Madame (1935) as John Fitzgerald
College Scandal (1935) as Student (scenes deleted)
Doubting Thomas (1935) as Jimmy Brown
Alice Adams (1935) as Walter Adams
Waterfront Lady (1935) as Ronny Hillyer aka Bill
Personal Maid's Secret (1935) as Kent Fletcher
East of Java (1935) as Larry Page
Kind Lady (1935) as Peter Santard
Ah, Wilderness! (1935) as Arthur
The Farmer in the Dell (1936) as Davy Davenport
Fury (1936) as Charlie
The Plainsman (1936) as A Young Trooper
Navy Blue and Gold (1937) as Weeks
Hold That Kiss (1938) as Steve Evans
Mother Carey's Chickens (1938) as Tom Hamilton Jr.
Fugitives for a Night (1938) as Matt Ryan
Room Service (1938) as Leo Davis
Spring Madness (1938) as Hat
The Shining Hour (1938) as Benny Collins
Bachelor Mother (1939) as Freddie Miller
Framed (1940) as Henry T. 'Hank' Parker
The Ghost Comes Home (1940) as Ernest
When the Daltons Rode (1940) as Emmett Dalton
Dr. Christian Meets the Women (1940) as Bill Ferris
Behind the News (1940) as Jeff Flavin
Ellery Queen's Penthouse Mystery (1941) as Sanders
Man Made Monster (1941) as Mark Adams
Father Steps Out (1941) as Jimmy Dugan
Citadel of Crime (1941) as Jim Rogers
Burma Convoy (1941) as Mike Weldon
Flying Cadets (1941) as Bob Ames
Louisiana Purchase (1941) as Robert Davis, Jr.
Man from Headquarters (1942) as Larry Doyle
Shepherd of the Ozarks (1942) as Lieutenant James J. 'Jimmy' Maloney, Jr.
Junior G-Men of the Air (1942, Serial) as Jerry Markham
Wake Island (1942) as Johnny Rudd
City of Silent Men (1942) as Gil Davis
Underground Agent (1942) as Johnny Davis
Silent Witness (1943) as Bruce L. Strong - Attorney
Keep 'Em Slugging (1943) as Frank Moulton
Here Comes Elmer (1943) as Joe Maxwell
Mystery Broadcast (1943) as Michael Jerome
O, My Darling Clementine (1943) as 'Dapper' Dan Franklin
Rosie the Riveter (1944) as Charlie Doran
And the Angels Sing (1944) as Oliver
I Love a Soldier (1944) as Little Soldier (uncredited)
Arson Squad (1945) as Tom Mitchell
How Doooo You Do!!! (1945) as Tom Brandon
Gay Blades (1946) as Frankie Dowell
They Made Me a Killer (1946) as Patrolman Al Wilson
Ginger (1946) as Barney O'Hara
It's a Wonderful Life (1946) as Sam Wainwright
The Hucksters (1947) as Max Herman
Killer Dill (1947) as William T. Allen
Shed No Tears (1948) as Lt. Hutton - Police Detective
Main Street to Broadway (1953) as Frank Albertson (uncredited)
Girl on the Run (1953) as Hank
The Man Who Knew Too Much (1956) as Worker at the Taxidermist's (uncredited)
Nightfall (1957) as Dr. Edward Gurston
The Enemy Below (1957) as Lt. Crain
The Last Hurrah (1958) as Jack Mangan
Official Detective (1958, Episode: "Muggers") as Detective David 'King' Cassidy
Psycho (1960) as Tom Cassidy
Man-Trap (1961) as Paul Snavely
Don't Knock the Twist (1962) as Herbert 'Herb' Walcott
Papa's Delicate Condition (1963) as Gambler (uncredited)
Bye Bye Birdie (1963) as Sam, the Mayor
Johnny Cool (1963) as Bill Blakely

Selected television

Notes

References

External links

1909 births
1964 deaths
American male child actors
American male film actors
American male television actors
Male actors from Minnesota
Burials at Holy Cross Cemetery, Culver City
People from Fergus Falls, Minnesota
People from Puyallup, Washington
First Motion Picture Unit personnel
20th-century American male actors